David Allan Farrish (born August 1, 1956) is a Canadian former professional ice hockey defenceman who played 430 games in the National Hockey League (NHL) with the New York Rangers, Quebec Nordiques, and Toronto Maple Leafs between 1976 and 1984. He featured in the 1979 Stanley Cup Finals with the Rangers.

He also played in the American Hockey League and won the Eddie Shore Award as the league's best defenceman during the 1981–82 season. After his playing career Farrish worked as a coach.

Coaching career
Farrish has served as head coach for the Moncton Hawks, Salt Lake Golden Eagles, Fort Wayne Komets, Springfield Falcons, Louisiana IceGators and  the Pensacola Ice Pilots. At the NHL level, Farrish served as an assistant coach to Randy Carlyle with the Anaheim Ducks from 2005 to the middle of the 2011-12 season. On March 3, 2012, Farrish was appointed an assistant coach, again under Carlyle, with the Toronto Maple Leafs. Farrish was let go by the Maple Leafs in May 2014. He won the Stanley Cup with Anaheim in 2007.

Farrish was named as an assistant coach for the Colorado Avalanche on July 7, 2015. On May 23, 2017, Farrish was relieved of these duties.

Career statistics

Regular season and playoffs

References

External links
 

1956 births
Living people
Anaheim Ducks coaches
Baltimore Skipjacks players
Canadian expatriate ice hockey players in Austria
Canadian expatriate ice hockey players in Germany
Canadian ice hockey coaches
Canadian ice hockey defencemen
Colorado Avalanche coaches
EC VSV players
Hershey Bears players
Ice hockey people from Ontario
Moncton Hawks players
New Brunswick Hawks players
New Haven Nighthawks players
New York Rangers draft picks
New York Rangers players
People from Wingham, Ontario
Quebec Nordiques players
St. Catharines Saints players
San Diego Mariners draft picks
SC Riessersee players
Stanley Cup champions
Sudbury Wolves players
Syracuse Firebirds players
Toronto Maple Leafs players
Toronto Maple Leafs coaches
World Hockey Association first round draft picks